Legislative Assembly elections were held in the Indian state of Punjab in 1972 to elect the members of the Punjab Legislative Assembly. President's rule was imposed before the election. Chief Minister Zail Singh was elected as the leader of the ruling party.  Major opposition party was Shiromani Akali Dal led by leader of Opposition Parkash Singh Badal.

Results

Elected members

See also
Politics of Punjab, India

References

External links
Punjab Assembly Election Results in 1972

Punjab
1972
1972